Mount Bragg is a mountain in Antarctica,  high, standing  southwest of Gambacorta Peak in the southern Neptune Range, Pensacola Mountains. It was mapped by the United States Geological Survey from surveys and from U.S. Navy air photos, 1956–66, and named by the Advisory Committee on Antarctic Names for Ralph L. Bragg, a photographer with U.S. Navy Squadron VX-6 at McMurdo Station in 1964.

References 

Mountains of Queen Elizabeth Land
Pensacola Mountains